F Album is the sixth studio album of the Japanese duo KinKi Kids. It was released on December 26, 2002 and debuted at number two on the Oricon charts, selling 360,102 copies in its first week.  The album was certified platinum by the RIAJ for 400,000 copies shipped to stores in Japan.

Track listing

References

 F Album. Johnny's net. Retrieved October 31, 2009.

External links
 Official KinKi Kids website

2002 albums
KinKi Kids albums